Ethan Michael Roberts (born July 4, 1997) is an American professional baseball pitcher for the Chicago Cubs of Major League Baseball (MLB). He made his MLB debut in 2022.

Amateur career
Roberts attended White County High School in Sparta, Tennessee, and played college baseball at Tennessee Technological University. As a junior at Tennessee Tech in 2018, he went 6–1 with a 2.41 ERA and 14 saves over 71 innings pitched. Following the season's end, he was selected by the Chicago Cubs in the fourth round of the 2018 Major League Baseball draft.

Professional career
Roberts signed with the Cubs and made his professional debut with the Eugene Emeralds, posting a 5.40 ERA over 15 innings. In 2019, he began the year with the South Bend Cubs before being promoted to the Myrtle Beach Pelicans. Over 59 relief innings between the two clubs, Roberts went 4–5 with a 2.59 ERA, 13 saves, and 54 strikeouts. He did not play a minor league game in 2020 due to the cancellation of the season caused by the COVID-19 pandemic. Roberts began the 2021 season with the Tennessee Smokies and was promoted to the Iowa Cubs in early August. Over 39 relief appearances between the two clubs, Roberts went 4–2 with a 3.00 ERA and 72 strikeouts over 54 innings.

On November 19, 2021, the Cubs selected Roberts' contract and added him to their 40-man roster. On April 4, 2022, it was announced that Roberts had made the Opening Day roster. He made his MLB debut on April 9, throwing one scoreless inning of relief versus the Milwaukee Brewers. In early May, he was placed on the injured list with right shoulder inflammation. On June 23, it was announced he would be undergoing Tommy John surgery, ending his season.

References

External links

Tennessee Tech bio

1997 births
Living people
Baseball players from Tennessee
People from Sparta, Tennessee
Major League Baseball pitchers
Chicago Cubs players
Tennessee Tech Golden Eagles baseball players
Eugene Emeralds players
South Bend Cubs players
Myrtle Beach Pelicans players
Tennessee Smokies players
Iowa Cubs players